Daniel J. Reynolds, Jr. (1944 – December 26, 2019), was a Circuit Judge of the 10th Judicial Circuit (Bessemer Division) in Jefferson County, Alabama.   Born in 1944, he died on December 26, 2019.  He was a member of the Alabama Democratic Party.  He served as District Attorney of the Bessemer Division from 1973-1979.  He then became a Circuit Judge serving from (1979-1997) when he retired from elective office.  He then served in the private practice of law until his retirement in 2011.

Education
Reynolds was a graduate of Fairfield High School in Fairfield, Alabama.  He received both his undergraduate and law degree from the University of Alabama

Personal life
He was married to Katha (Holston) Reynolds with whom he had three children.   He served in the U.S. Army with the 101st Airborne Division during The Vietnam War.  He was also a member of Pleasant Hill United Methodist Church in McCalla, Alabama .

References 

1934 births
2019 deaths
Alabama Democrats
Circuit court judges in the United States
People from Fairfield, Alabama
University of Alabama School of Law alumni
20th-century American judges